Regine (German: Regine, die Tragödie einer Frau) is a 1927 German silent drama film directed by Erich Waschneck and starring Lee Parry, Harry Liedtke and Vivian Gibson.

The film's sets were designed by the art director Alfred Junge.

Cast
 Lee Parry as Regine, die Magd 
 Harry Liedtke as Frank Thomas 
 Vivian Gibson as Doris Ricarda 
 Maria Reisenhofer as Die Generalin 
 Antonie Jaeckel as Die Rätin 
 Albert Steinrück as Regines Vater 
 Oskar Homolka as Robert, ihr Bruder 
 Peter C. Leska as Marquis Juan Pedrona 
 Hermine Sterler as Die Hausdame 
 Wilhelm Diegelmann as Der Professor 
 Meinhart Maur as Der Diener

References

Bibliography
 Bock, Hans-Michael & Bergfelder, Tim. The Concise CineGraph. Encyclopedia of German Cinema. Berghahn Books, 2009.

External links

1927 films
Films of the Weimar Republic
Films directed by Erich Waschneck
German silent feature films
German black-and-white films
Films based on short fiction
Films based on works by Gottfried Keller
National Film films
German drama films
1927 drama films
Silent drama films
1920s German films